Duško Sakan (born 3 March 1989) is a Bosnian-Herzegovinian football midfielder playing with Gorica Šipovo.

Club career
Born in Šipovo (SR Bosnia and Herzegovina, SFR Yugoslavia), Sakan begin his career in the season 2006–07 playing with FK Borac Banja Luka. The following season, he joined another Premier League of Bosnia and Herzegovina side, NK Posušje where he stayed two seasons. In summer 2009 he returned to Borac and played with them in the following two and a half seasons. After finishing the 2009–10 season in third, the following year they became champions of the 2010–11 Premier League of Bosnia and Herzegovina. During the winter break of 2011–12, Sakan became one of the acquisitions of FK Rad for the second half of the 2011–12 Serbian SuperLiga.

He played two seasons for Austrian third tier side TSV St. Johann.

International career
After having been part of the Bosnian-Herzegovinian U-19 and U-21 teams, Sakan made an appearance for an unofficial Bosnia and Herzegovina selection in 2011. at 16 December 2011, in a friendly match against Poland.

He was also part of the Republika Srpska national football team (league selection) in September 2013.

Honours
Borac Banja Luka
Bosnian-Herzegovinian Premier League: 2010–11
Bosnian-Herzegovinian Cup: 2009–10
Republika Srpska Cup: 2010–11

References

External links
 
 
 

1989 births
Living people
People from Šipovo
Serbs of Bosnia and Herzegovina
Association football midfielders
Bosnia and Herzegovina footballers
Bosnia and Herzegovina youth international footballers
Bosnia and Herzegovina under-21 international footballers
FK Borac Banja Luka players
HŠK Posušje players
FK Rad players
FK Rudar Prijedor players
FK Sloboda Mrkonjić Grad players
NK Metalleghe-BSI players
NK Čelik Zenica players
Ängelholms FF players
TSV St. Johann im Pongau players
Premier League of Bosnia and Herzegovina players
Serbian SuperLiga players
First League of the Republika Srpska players
First League of the Federation of Bosnia and Herzegovina players
Ettan Fotboll players
Austrian Regionalliga players
Bosnia and Herzegovina expatriate footballers
Expatriate footballers in Serbia
Bosnia and Herzegovina expatriate sportspeople in Serbia
Expatriate footballers in Sweden
Bosnia and Herzegovina expatriate sportspeople in Sweden
Expatriate footballers in Austria
Bosnia and Herzegovina expatriate sportspeople in Austria